Adalid is a surname. Notable people with the surname include:

Agustín Lazo Adalid (1896–1971), Mexican artist and playwright
Manuel de Adalid y Gamero (1872–1947), Honduran composer
Marcial del Adalid y Gurréa (1826–1881), Spanish composer